CNAV Endeavour (later CFAV Endeavour, after the 1968 unification of the Canadian Armed Forces) was an . The vessel served the Royal Canadian Navy and later the Canadian Forces from 1965 to 1999. Endeavour performed research in oceanography and anti-submarine warfare, primarily on the West Coast of Canada.

Description
Endeavours hull was stiffened for work in areas with ice.

The ship was propelled by two shafts driven by a diesel-electric engine creating . The machinery space was insulated to reduce noise. Endeavour could turn 2 times its length. The ship had a  helicopter deck. The ship was fitted with two 9-ton Austin-Weston telescopic cranes. Two oceanographical winches, each holding  of wire, two bathythermograph winches and one deep-sea coring winch were also fitted. The vessel had a complement of 50, which included 10 officers, 13 scientists and two aircrew.

Service history
Endeavour was ordered from Yarrows Ltd. and constructed at their shipyard in Esquimalt, British Columbia and given the yard number 250. Endeavours keel was laid down on 4 September 1963 and the ship was launched on 4 September 1964. The vessel was commissioned into the Royal Canadian Navy on 9 March 1965 and given the hull number AGOR 171. Endeavour was deployed on the West Coast of Canada researching anti-submarine warfare from the time the ship entered service until 1999. The vessel replaced the old  . In 1999, Endeavour was transferred to the East Coast to replace  temporarily, while Quest was undergoing modernisation. In 2000, Endeavour was discarded.

Citations

Sources
 }

External links
 Endeavour (AGOR 171) - Haze Gray and Underway - Naval History and Photography

Auxiliary ships of the Royal Canadian Navy
Endeavour-class oceanographic research ships
1965 ships